WYFA (107.1 MHz) is a non-commercial FM radio station licensed to Waynesboro, Georgia, and serving the Augusta metropolitan area.  It is owned by the Bible Broadcasting Network and broadcasts a Christian talk and teaching radio format.

Hosts on WYFA include Adrian Rogers, Joni Eareckson Tada, Chuck Swindoll and J. Vernon McGee.  The station and its hosts hold periodic fundraisers on the air to support the station and their ministries.

WYFA has an effective radiated power (ERP) of 25,000 watts.  The transmitter is on Old Waynesboro Road in Waynesboro.

History
WYFA signed on March 4, 1994, with its current format. 100.9 WTHB-FM (also licensed to Waynesboro) originally signed on as WYFA in 1988 with the same format.

See also

Media in Augusta, Georgia

References

External links
Bible Broadcasting Network website

Bible Broadcasting Network
Radio stations established in 1994
1994 establishments in Georgia (U.S. state)
YFA